USS LST-565 was a United States Navy  in commission from 1944 to 1946.

Construction and commissioning
LST-565 was laid down on 16 March 1944 at Evansville, Indiana, by the Missouri Valley Bridge and Iron Company. She was launched on 8 May 1944, sponsored by Mrs. Vergil P. Dyer, and commissioned on 25 May 1944.

Service history
During World War II, LST-565 was assigned to the Pacific Theater of Operations. She took part in the Philippines campaign, participating in the landings on Leyte in October 1944, the landings on Mindoro in December 1944, and the landings at Zambales-Subic Bay in January 1945. She then took part in the invasion and occupation of Okinawa Gunto in May 1945.

Following the war, LST-565 performed occupation duty in the Far East and saw service in China until mid-May 1946, when she departed for the United States.

Decommissioning and disposal
After returning to the United States, LST-565 was decommissioned on 13 June 1946 and stricken from the Navy List on 3 July 1946. She was sold for scrapping on 21 June 1948.

Honors and awards
LST-565 earned four battle stars for her World War II service.

References

NavSource Online: Amphibious Photo Archive LST-565

 

LST-542-class tank landing ships
World War II amphibious warfare vessels of the United States
Ships built in Evansville, Indiana
1944 ships